Ramnagar is a village in the southern state of Karnataka, India. It is situated in Bijapur Taluk of Bijapur.

Demographics

2011

References

Villages in Bijapur district, Karnataka